The eighty-eight chapters of the science-fiction manga series Chobits are written and illustrated by Clamp. Chobits appeared as a serial in the Japanese manga magazine Young Magazine from the 43rd issue for 2000 to the 48th issue for 2002. Kodansha collected the chapters in eight bound volumes from February 14, 2001 to November 29, 2002. The series centers on Hideki Motosuwa, who finds an abandoned persocom—a personal computer in human form—which he names "Chi" after the only word that she initially can speak. As he forms a relationship with Chi, he gradually learns about her mysterious past and the relationships between humans and persocoms.

Tokyopop licensed the series for English-language release in North America and published the eight volumes between  April 23, 2002 and October 7, 2003. Tokyopop's license expired in August 2009; Dark Horse Comics has released Chobits in omnibus format, beginning on March 24, 2010, and concluding on September 29, 2010. Madman Entertainment distributed the series as published by Tokyopop in Australia and New Zealand. The series is published in Hong Kong in Traditional Chinese by Jonesky, in Singapore in Simplified Chinese by Chuang Yi, in South Korea by Daiwon C.I., in France by Pika Édition, in Spain by Norma Editorial, in Mexico by Grupo Editorial Vid, in Italy by Star Comics (which serialized it in Express), in Germany by Egmont Manga & Anime, in Poland by Japonica Polonica Fantastica, in Brazil by JBC, and in Sweden by Carlsen Verlag.

Chobits was adapted as an anime television series by Madhouse. The series was directed by Morio Asaka with music by K-Taro Takanami and character designs by Hisashi Abe. The series was broadcast in 26 episodes from 2 April 2002 to 24 September 2002 across Japan, East Asia, and Southeast Asia by the anime satellite television network, Animax and the terrestrial Tokyo Broadcasting System network. When it was released on DVD, a 27th episode was added as an OVA.


Volume list

References

External links
TSB official Chobits anime site 
 Tokyopop official Chobits manga site (Archived)

Chobits chapter list
Chobits